Heriyanto, also known as Aa Jimmy (15 January 1983 – 22 December 2018), was an Indonesian actor and comedian.

Biography
Heriyanto was of Sundanese-Arab-Betawi blood. He was familiarly called Argo and was more widely known as Aa Jimmy, because his face resembled that of Abdullah Gymnastiar. He first gained notability after playing in the Jaka Baret comedy show in 2006 on a private television station.

In 2009, he joined the comedy group Teamlo as a vocalist, accompanied by Wawan Bakwan, Ade Dora and Kudil. After Teamlo disbanded, he and Ade Dora formed a comedy duo group called Jigo.

He died on 22 December 2018 from the Sunda Strait tsunami, aged 35.

Filmography

Film
 Asoy Geboy (2008) - Hilman
 Janda Kembang (2009) - Pak Ustad
 King (2009)
 Enak Sama Enak (2012)
 Soekarno: Independent Indonesia (2013)
 Seputih Cinta Melati (2014)
 Shy Shy Cat (2016) - Penghulu
 Jomblo (remake) (2017) - Himself
 Udah Putusin Aja! (2018) - (final film role)

Television
 RT Sukowi
 Jagoan Silat

References

1983 births
2018 deaths
Indonesian actors
Indonesian people of Arab descent
Deaths in tsunamis
Natural disaster deaths in Indonesia
People from Tasikmalaya